Below are the squads for the 2021 Southeast Asian Games women's football tournament, hosted by Vietnam, which is taking place from 11 May to 21 May 2022.

Group A

Vietnam
Head coach: Mai Đức Chung

Philippines
Head coach:  Alen Stajcic

Cambodia
Head coach: Prak Vuthy

Group B

Thailand
Head coach:  Miyo Okamoto

Myanmar
Head coach: Tin Myint Aung

|-
! colspan="9"  style="background:yellow; text-align:left;"|
|- style="background:#dfedfd;"

|-
! colspan="9"  style="background:green; text-align:left;"|
|- style="background:#dfedfd;"

|-
! colspan="9"  style="background:red; text-align:left;"|
|- style="background:#dfedfd;"

Laos
Head coach: Vongmisay Soubouakham

Singapore
Head coach: Stephen Ng

References

Football at the 2021 Southeast Asian Games